Rugby Union Club Piešťany is a Slovak rugby club based in Piešťany, created in 2014. They currently participate in international tournaments, local tournaments and friendly matches with other Slovak teams.

The team plays at PFK Piešťany´s  football pitch, and wears blue, yellow and white.

History

Creation
The club was established in 2014 by Terry Purton and Charles Cimetiere, who are initially involved to develop the sports association. Furthermore, Terry Purton develops the club's training facilities and acquires equipment.

Rugby life
The club currently provides support to any rugby team who needs additional players for friendly matches and tournaments. The club is expected to establish a full squad shortly to participate in league matches and tournaments independently. The club welcomes and accommodates both native Slovaks and expatriates with a variety of playing experiences. The club emphasises that prior rugby experience is not necessary to join. As Piešťany is Europewide known spa  city, it attracts investment from Europe and beyond. This explains the diversity of nationalities representing the club at present.

Trainings
The club offers weekly training sessions to anyone interested in rugby. Men, women, children, of any age and experience are encouraged to contact the club for further information about joining. Currently, the club holds trainings sessions every Tuesday and Thursday evening and Sunday morning. These training sessions are held primarily in English, although commands are often translated to Slovak. Rugby Union Club Piešťany  offers a dynamic mixture of fitness, basic skills, advanced skills and team building. The aim of the training sessions are to ensure that the players are physically, mentally and strategically ready for competitive games, in a diverse and friendly community.

Competitions
The club plays currently in Slovak league, including Rugby Klub Bratislava, Rugby Club Slovan Bratislava, Trnava Rugby Club, Zilina Rugby Club, and Kosice Rugby Club.

Current squad

2015-16

List of former players 
2015-16

References
 Rugby Klub Bratislava - Skola Rugby
  creation of Rugby Klub Bratislava - Skola Rugby
 "Charlie" Charles CIMETIERE, President and Creator of the Rugby Klub Bratislava - Skola Rugby

External links
 Rugby Club Piestany Facebook
 Rugby Klub Bratislava web site Wordpress
 Rugby Slovakia

Rugby union in Slovakia
2014 establishments in Slovakia
Rugby clubs established in 2014